Marijampolė University of Applied Sciences (Lithuanian: Marijampolės kolegija, MARKO) is an institution of higher education located in Marijampolė, Lithuania. It was established in 2001 after merger of Marijampole Pedagogical High School, and Marijampole Agricultural High School. The university offers 9 undergraduate and 2 post-graduate courses.

About

Marijampole University of Applied Sciences is the only higher education institution in Sudovia region. Currently the University of Applied Sciences consists of 2 faculties. The Faculty of Education Studies and Social Work has two departments – Law, Management and Communication as well as Pedagogy, Arts and Social Work. The Faculty of Business and Technology consists of Departments of Technology as well as Business and Economics.

Study programs 
MUAS  offers 9 full-time study programs, partial studies through exchange programs, as well as informal study courses and training. Program duration is 3 years (6 semesters) and students receive a professional bachelor's degree upon graduation.

 Business English and Communication
 Social work
 International Business Management
 Transport logistics
 Information Technology Systems and Cybersecurity
 Sustainable Business Management
 Accounting and Finance
 Childhood Pedagogy
 Law and Public Procurement

References

External links 
 

Educational institutions established in 2001
2001 establishments in Lithuania
Colleges in Lithuania